Pseudohemihyalea hampsoni is a moth in the family Erebidae. It was described by James John Joicey and George Talbot in 1916. It is found in French Guiana.

References

Moths described in 1916
hampsoni